Llanddona Common is a Local Nature Reserve on Anglesey, in Wales. The common comprises a number of smaller parcels of land.

External links
 Anglesey Nature website
 Llanddona landscape

Nature reserves in Anglesey